The City of Shoalhaven is a local government area in the south-eastern coastal region of New South Wales, Australia. The Princes Highway passes through the area, and the South Coast railway line traverses the northern section, terminating at Bomaderry.

The City was established on 1 July 1948 as the Shoalhaven Shire, following the amalgamation of the Municipalities of Nowra, Berry, Broughton's Vale, Ulladulla, South Shoalhaven, and the shires of Cambewarra and Clyde.The Governor of NSW on 13 July 1979 proclaimed Shoalhaven as a city. The Shire was converted and constituted on 1 August 1979 simultaneously as a municipality and city.

History
Modern-day groupings of the Illawarra and South Coast Aboriginal peoples are based on information compiled by white anthropologists from the late 1870s. Two divisions were initially presented (refer Ridley, 1878), using geographical location and language, though these criteria are now expanded into five divisions and given Aboriginal names, as follows (after C.Sefton, 1983):

 Dharawal – general name for the Aboriginal people of the area on the east coast of New South Wales from Botany Bay to Shoalhaven, and west to Berrima and Camden.
 Wodi-Wodi (or Wadi-Wadi) – a subdivision of Thuruwal, includes the Aboriginal people of the coast from Wollongong to Shoalhaven.
 Gurandada and Tharumba (or Dharumba) – those people living around the Shoalhaven River.

The Jerrinja people record their traditional lands as stretching from Crooked River in the north to Clyde River in the south, from the mountains to the sea at Roseby Park.

George Bass explored the area in 1797, following Seven Mile Beach. He crossed the shoals at the entrance to the river, calling it "Shoals Haven" due to the shallowness of the river mouth. This river is now known as the Crookhaven, but the name was adopted for the Shoalhaven area and the Shoalhaven River.

Towns and localities

It includes the following towns, suburbs and localities:

Localities with no population in 2016 included:

Council

Current composition and election method
Shoalhaven City Council is composed of thirteen Councillors, including the mayor, for a fixed four-year term. The mayor is directly elected while the twelve other councillors are elected proportionally as three separate wards, each electing four councillors. The most recent election was held in 2021 and the makeup of the Council, including the mayor, is: Amanda Finley.

Tourism and culture
The Shoalhaven can be reached from Sydney by car via the Princes Highway and by rail via the South Coast railway line which terminates just north of Nowra at Bomaderry. The Shoalhaven is adjacent to the Jervis Bay Territory. The Shoalhaven area is home to numerous species of native Australian flora and fauna.

The area is well known for its strong commitment to the arts and music, featuring the See Change and See Celebrations festivals in the Jervis Bay and St Georges Basin areas, as well as the EscapeArtfest festival and Blessing of the Fleet in the Ulladulla area.

Tourists to Shoalhaven can enjoy a wealth of cultural and nature-based activities and experiences, including whale-watching, kayaking, visiting beaches and tastings at wineries. Some of the most famous establishments for visitors in Shoalhaven are Rick Stein at Bannisters, Cupitt's Estate and Coolangatta Estate.

Heritage listings 
Heritage listings for the City of Shoalhaven include:

 Bherwerre Beach, Wreck Bay: Hive shipwreck

See also
 Shoalhaven River
 Shoalhaven Scheme

References

 
Coastal cities in Australia
1948 establishments in Australia